The Dance Goes On is a 1980 American documentary film.

It was narrated by Rudolf Nureyev.

References

External links
The Dance Goes On at IMDb

1980 films
1980 documentary films
American documentary films
1980s American films